Árpád Pédery (1 February 1890 – 21 October 1914) was a Hungarian gymnast who competed in the 1912 Summer Olympics. He was born  in Budapest.

He was part of the Hungarian team, which won the silver medal in the gymnastics men's team, European system event in 1912. He later joined the Austro-Hungarian Army and was killed during World War I in Luzsek, Galicia.

See also
 List of Olympians killed in World War I

References

External links
profile
profile 

1890 births
1914 deaths
Gymnasts from Budapest
Hungarian male artistic gymnasts
Gymnasts at the 1912 Summer Olympics
Olympic gymnasts of Hungary
Olympic silver medalists for Hungary
Olympic medalists in gymnastics
Austro-Hungarian military personnel killed in World War I
Medalists at the 1912 Summer Olympics